Arawana is also an alternative spelling of Arowana, a kind of fish.

Arawana is a genus of ladybirds in the tribe Chilocorini, which is in the subfamily Chilocorinae. There are at least two described species in Arawana.

Species
These two species belong to the genus Arawana.
 Arawana arizonica (Casey, 1899)
 Arawana scapularis

References

Further reading

 
 
 
 
 
 
 

Coccinellidae genera